Dita Indah Sari (born 30 December 1972) is an Indonesian trade union and socialist activist. As a human rights campaigner during the Suharto regime, she was sentenced to five years' imprisonment in 1996 on the charge of sedition. During her imprisonment, she was named a prisoner of conscience by Amnesty International.

After her release in 1999 she was elected Chairperson by the Congress of the National Front for Indonesian Workers Struggle (FNPBI). She was awarded the 2001 Ramon Magsaysay Award for Emergent Leadership. Politically she is the leader of the PRD, a socialist party within the broader Papernas alliance.

References

1972 births
Amnesty International prisoners of conscience held by Indonesia
Indonesian prisoners and detainees
21st-century Indonesian women politicians
21st-century Indonesian politicians
Living people
People from Medan
People's Democratic Party (Indonesia) politicians
Indonesian trade unionists
Ramon Magsaysay Award winners